Yi Lijun (4 December 1934 – 7 February 2022), also known by her pen name Han Yi, was a Chinese translator who had been honored by the Polish Government.

Yi was one of the foremost translators of Polish fiction. For her contributions to the introduction of Polish literature to foreign readers, she was honoured with the Polish Literature Order, the Knight's Cross (2010), the Outstanding Contribution to Promote Polish Literature Award (2007) and the Transatlantic Prize.

Biography
Yi was born in Huanggang, Hubei in December 1934. She started publishing her works in 1952.

In 1954, after graduating from Wuhan University, she was sent abroad to study at the expense of the government, she entered Warsaw University, where she majored in Polish language and literature.

In 1962, Yi returned to China. She taught Polish at the Department of East European Language, Beijing Foreign Studies University.

Yi joined the China Writers Association in 1988. She died in Beijing in 2022.

Works
 The History of Poland Literature
 Poland Literature

Translations
 The Knights of the Cross
 With Fire and Sword
 The Deluge
 The Captive Mind (Czeslaw Milosz)



 Pan Tadeusz
 (Adam Mickiewicz)
 Glory and Vainglory (Jarosław Iwaszkiewicz)
 Ferdydurke (Witold Gombrowicz)

Awards
 Polish Literature Order
 Polish National Education Committee Order
 The Knight's Cross (2000), by Polish President Aleksandr Kwasniewski
 Bing Xin Literature Prize
 National Book Award
 Outstanding Contribution to Promote Polish Literature Award (2007), by the Polish Foreign Minister
 The Cross of Military Officers of the Republic of Poland (2011), by Polish President Bronisław Komorowski
 Transatlantic Prize (2012)
Lifetime Achievement Award in Translation (2018)

Personal life
She was married to a Chinese physicist, Yuan Hanrong, he also was a graduate of Warsaw University.

References

1934 births
People from Huanggang
University of Warsaw alumni
Wuhan University alumni
People's Republic of China translators
Polish–Chinese translators
Living people
20th-century Chinese translators
21st-century Chinese translators